A hypohalite is an oxyanion containing a halogen in oxidation state +1. This includes hypoiodite, hypobromite and hypochlorite. In hypofluorite (oxyfluoride) the fluorine atom is in a −1 oxidation state.

Hypohalites are also encountered in organic chemistry, often as acyl hypohalites (see the Hunsdiecker reaction). Sodium hypohalite is used in the haloform reaction as a test for methyl ketones.

Structure 
The Cl-O bond length in crystalline sodium hypochlorite pentahydrate, NaOCl·5H2O, is 1.686 Å, while in sodium hypobromite pentahydrate, NaOBr·5H2O, the Br–O bond length is 8% longer at 1.820 Å.

References

Hypohalites